Ice FM was a local radio station in Cromwell, New Zealand which commenced operation in July 1996. It was started because Cromwell was the only town in the Lakes District region that had no radio station of its own. The studio was based at the Top of The Mall in the Cromwell Shopping Centre.

FM Transmission
The actual FM transmitter was based on Hospital Hill and broadcast on 100 watts, which was also the then-location of the TV Transmitters for Cromwell, TV1, TV2, and TV3 which were relays from the Obelisk transmitters. The relay stations existed to infill the shadow areas of Cromwell.

Direction
Any Obelisk based transmitters were primarily directed towards Alexandra. Their transmissions back then, as now, did not cover Cromwell due to shadows in their transmission path, plus the fact the transmitters being so high up, have blockers on their antennas to ensure they only transmit to certain areas, as 360 degree coverage was causing interference outside their intended broadcast area.

Location
Whilst Ice FM started in Cromwell, it quickly set up a transmitter within a few months on 91.9FM and this was based at the Alexandra Airport. In November 1998 a transmitter was installed in Queenstown based at Fern Hill on 90.4 FM.

Content
Music played was from the 1960s to the present day, with all announcers and voiceovers local.
 
At the time the station started, it was amongst a handful of stations in New Zealand using radio automation based on computers. A French system was employed, called "Dalet".

Regular announcers on the station were Stuart Campbell, Craig Stephen, Gary Fraser, Chris Diack, Paul Gestro, Becky Parkins (Crawford), Andrew Munsey, Mark McCarron, and Rachael Turner.

Craig Stephen, local musician, and technician held responsibility of the engineering side of the station.

In November 2001 Ice FM went off the air when its frequencies were leased to Blue Skies FM Ltd, headed by former Radio Otago broadcaster Mike Bain, broadcasting from new studios based in Alexandra.
Blue Skies FM used two frequencies, 99.9 FM and 91.9 FM, until it moved its signal to Obelisk, broadcasting on 96.7FM. Blue Skies FM ceased broadcasting following a successful takeover by Mediaworks in October 2008, making way for a nationwide network station, The Breeze.

The Queenstown operation of Ice FM remained operating and changed its name to Next FM and aired until 2005.

Frequencies 

99.9 FM Cromwell
91.9 FM Alexandra
90.4 FM Queenstown

Radio stations in New Zealand
Defunct radio stations in New Zealand

References